Wilbur Dam is a hydroelectric dam on the Watauga River in Carter County, in the U.S. state of Tennessee. It is one of two dams on the river owned and operated by the Tennessee Valley Authority.  The dam impounds Wilbur Lake, which extends for about  up the Watauga to the base of Watauga Dam.  Wilbur Dam was completed in 1912 making it the second oldest dam in the TVA system behind Ocoee Dam No. 1. Wilbur Dam was one of the first major hydroelectric projects in Tennessee, and remains one of the oldest dams in the TVA system.

In 1907, the Doe River Light & Power Company began purchasing land rights for construction of Wilbur Dam, although the company struggled with finances and sold the project to the Watauga Power Company in 1910.  Watauga Power completed the dam in just two years, and found a ready market for the dam's electricity at nearby Elizabethton.  In 1927, the dam was purchased by the Tennessee Central Service Company, which changed its name to East Tennessee Light & Power Company two years later.  The flood of August 1940 overtopped the dam and destroyed its powerhouse, and five years later, East Tennessee Light & Power sold its assets, including Wilbur Dam, to the Tennessee Valley Authority.

Wilbur Dam was originally equipped with a flashboard-controlled spillway (similar to nearby Nolichucky Dam).  In 1947, TVA outfitted the dam with a new gate-controlled spillway and raised it  to accommodate the tailwaters of Watauga Dam, which was then nearing completion.

References

External links

Wilbur Reservoir — official TVA site
Wilbur Reservoir — Tennessee Wildlife Resources Agency

Dams on the Watauga River
Dams in Tennessee
Tennessee Valley Authority dams
Buildings and structures in Carter County, Tennessee
Hydroelectric power plants in Tennessee
Dams completed in 1912
Energy infrastructure completed in 1912
Elizabethton, Tennessee
1912 establishments in Tennessee